The Midland Depot was built by the Chicago and North Western Railway (C&NW) in 1907 as part of an extension from Pierre to Rapid City. It is located on Main Street in Midland, South Dakota. The building is a two-story wooden depot, built to the C&NWs' plan number 4 design, of a standard combination depot with living rooms overhead. In 1939, the Midland Depot had a single daily departure in each direction, to Chicago or Rapid City via the Minnesota & Black Hills Express. Passenger service ended October 24, 1960, with the discontinuance of the Dakota 400. Today the depot houses the Pioneer Museum.

The depot was listed in the National Register of Historic Places in 2019 because of its architecture and also because of its association with the development of Midland.

References 

Railway stations in the United States opened in 1907
1907 establishments in South Dakota
Railway stations on the National Register of Historic Places in South Dakota
Midland, South Dakota
Transportation in Haakon County, South Dakota
National Register of Historic Places in Haakon County, South Dakota
Railway stations closed in 1960
Former railway stations in South Dakota